Andrés Eduardo Machado (born April 22, 1993) is a Venezuelan professional baseball pitcher in the Washington Nationals organization. He previously played in Major League Baseball (MLB) for the Kansas City Royals.

Career

Kansas City Royals
On November 20, 2010, Machado signed with the Kansas City Royals organization as an international free agent. Machado made his professional debut with the DSL Royals, pitching to a 4.66 ERA in 7 appearances. In 2012, Machado returned to the DSL Royals, logging a 2–1 record and 2.87 ERA in 15 appearances. He spent the 2013 season with the rookie ball Burlington Royals, posting an 0–8 record and 8.34 ERA in 12 games for the team. He returned to Burlington in 2014, and pitched to a 1–2 record and 3.63 ERA in 7 games. Machado underwent Tommy John surgery and missed the entire 2015 season as a result. He returned to the organization in 2016, and played for the rookie ball Idaho Falls Chukars, posting a 2–4 record and 3.99 ERA in 13 appearances. He split the 2017 season between the High-A Wilmington Blue Rocks, the Double-A Northwest Arkansas Naturals, and the Triple-A Omaha Storm Chasers, logging a cumulative 8–9 record and 4.54 ERA in 29 appearances between the three teams.

Machado was selected to the 40-man roster and called up to the majors for the first time on September 1, 2017. In his rookie season, Machado made 2 appearances for the Royals, struggling to a 22.09 ERA. Machado was non-tendered by the Royals on November 30, 2018, making him a free agent. On December 3, Machado re-signed with the Royals on a minor league contract. He was assigned to AAA Omaha Storm Chasers to start the 2019 season, and pitched to a 3–2 record and 2.89 ERA with 65 strikeouts in 44 appearances for the team. He became a free agent following the 2019 season. Machado again re-signed with the club on a new minor league contract on November 20, 2019. 

In July 2020, Machado signed on to play for the Eastern Reyes del Tigre of the Constellation Energy League (a makeshift 4-team independent league created as a result of the COVID-19 pandemic) for the 2020 season. He became a free agent on November 2, 2020.

Washington Nationals
On February 26, 2021, Machado signed a minor league contract with the Washington Nationals organization. He was assigned to the Triple-A Rochester Red Wings to begin the 2021 season, and pitched to a stellar 0.96 ERA in 7 appearances for the team. On June 12, Machado was selected to the active roster. He made his Nationals debut on June 30, 2021.  Machado earned his first career win on August 7, 2021, pitching in relief against the Atlanta Braves. After working a scoreless eighth inning with the Nationals trailing by two runs, Machado was the pitcher of record when Luis García and Riley Adams drove in a trio of runs to put Washington on top in the ninth inning.

Machado made 51 appearances for Washington in 2022, recording a 3.34 ERA with 46 strikeouts in 59.1 innings pitched. He was designated for assignment by the Nationals on January 10, 2023, after the signing of Corey Dickerson was made official. On January 17, he cleared waivers and was sent outright to Triple-A Rochester.

References

External links

 

1993 births
Living people
Burlington Royals players
Cardenales de Lara players
Caribes de Anzoátegui players
Dominican Summer League Royals players
Venezuelan expatriate baseball players in the Dominican Republic
Idaho Falls Chukars players
Kansas City Royals players
Major League Baseball pitchers
Major League Baseball players from Venezuela
Northwest Arkansas Naturals players
Omaha Storm Chasers players
Rochester Red Wings players
Venezuelan expatriate baseball players in the United States
Washington Nationals players
Wilmington Blue Rocks players
People from Carabobo
Eastern Reyes del Tigre players
2023 World Baseball Classic players